Penicillium rademirici is a species of fungus in the genus Penicillium.

References

rademirici
Fungi described in 1985